Posthumous Success is the 2009 album by Tom Brosseau.

Album insight 
The album cover, a photo by Autumn de Wilde, shows Tom Brosseau, Sara Watkins, and Largo owner, Mark Flanagan, standing backstage in a mirrored hallway. Design and layout were created by longtime Brosseau collaborator, DLT.

Blurb from FatCat Records: "Tom Brosseau’s third full-length for FatCat marks a huge stylistic shift away from the spare, acoustic arrangements of his previous releases."

Track listing 
 "My Favorite Color Blue"
 "Been True"
 "Big Time"
 "Boothill"
 "You Don't Know My Friends"
 "Love To New Heights"
 "Youth Decay"
 "Give Me A Drumroll"
 "Miss Lucy"
 "Axe & Stump"
 "Chandler, AZ"
 "Wishbone Medallion"
 "My Favorite Color Blue"

Personnel 
 Tom Brosseau: Vocals, acoustic and electric guitar
 Adam Pierce: Drums on tracks 2, 3, 5, and 10
 Rob Laakso: Electric guitar on tracks 2, 3, 5
 Gary Jimmerson: Drums on tracks 6, 8, 12, and 13
 Ethan Rose: Synthesizers on tracks 6, 8, 9, 12, and 13; Banjo on track 4
 Adam Porterfield: Loops on track 6
 Shelley Short: Backing vocals in tracks 4 and 12
 Jayme Layne: Vocals on track 3
 Jeremy Backofen: Audio engineer, additional vocals
 Rob King: Fender Rhodes

References

2009 albums
Tom Brosseau albums